Atsushi Sasaki (born 7 September 1971) is a Japanese luger. He competed at the 1992 Winter Olympics, the 1994 Winter Olympics and the 1998 Winter Olympics.

References

External links
 

1971 births
Living people
Japanese male lugers
Olympic lugers of Japan
Lugers at the 1992 Winter Olympics
Lugers at the 1994 Winter Olympics
Lugers at the 1998 Winter Olympics
Sportspeople from Sapporo